Nikolay Vladimirovich Kolyada (also transliterated as Nikolai Koliada) is a Russian actor, director, writer, playwright, and playwriting teacher. Theatre critic John Freedman names Kolyada as one of several dramatists and directors who might be designated as "fathers" or "mothers" of Russia's contemporary theatre movement. (Other contenders mentioned are Aleksei Kazantsev, Elena Gremina, Nadezhda Ptushkina, and Ol’ga Mukhina).  The New York Times said that Kolyada's work has made a Yekaterinburg a "center of modern drama." Kolyada is one of the first Russian playwrights to address homosexuality in his work, especially in Slingshot.

Career 
Kolyada was born December 4, 1957 in Presnogor'kovka in the Kustanai region of Kazakhstan. He studied theater in Sverdlovsk, Russia (now known as Yekaterinburg). He worked as an actor with the Sverdlovsk Academic Theatre of Drama, and studied writing at the Gorky Literary Institute in Moscow. He gained international repute with his play Slingshot, which gave a sympathetic portrayal of a gay relationship. The play featured a romance between a nurse and his patient, a soldier wounded in the Soviet–Afghan War. Although the gay subject matter was shocking in Moscow, it earned him acclaim abroad when the play received its world premiere at the San Diego Repertory Theatre in 1989.

When he began writing for the theater in the mid-1980s, Kolyada got a reputation for "chernukha", which critic John Freedman describes as an "almost untranslatable but expressive Russian noun [combining] shades of gloom, doom, bile, and jaundice colored with foul-mouthed-insolence." His plays were known for their naturalistic approach to representing life's banal and pitiful troubles. His plays were among the first in Russia to use profanity, and are known for it. His scant use of profanity violated taboo at the time, but set the stage for much more pervasive obscenities by 2010.

After living and working in Moscow for a time, Kolyada returned to Yekaterinburg, and has been instrumental in bringing the city's theater activity to prominence. He has taught playwriting at the Ural Institute and the Ekaterinburg State Theatre Institute since 1992, often teaching auditors as well as enrolled students. His students would present their work at his Kolyada Theater in Yekaterinburg. Kolyada founded his theatre in 2001 - it has changed venue in Yekaterinburg several times. His is cited as one of the few playwriting programs in Russia, and several of his students have gone on to be produced in the more demanding venues of Moscow. Two of Kolyada's students, Oleg Bogayev and Vassily Sigarev have gained international acclaim and been produced in the United States.

Kolyada is a prolific playwright. In 2006, Kolyada told a reporter, "I've written 90 plays. Thirty of them are good." By 2010, the count of his plays exceeded 100.

As a director, Kolyada is known for stark and dramatic productions using minimalist scenery and a stylized performance style. Critic John Freedman described the design of one production as typical of Kolyada's approach. He wrote, "The use of water and the sheet of plastic are characteristic of Kolyada’s theatre art: the barest of devices, the simplest of objects, the most powerful of effects." Moscow News critic Irina Korneeva Vremya wrote in 2002 that she found his directing style to be "touching," but repetitive, and ultimately "artless," writing that "an abundance of superfluous detail and endless strolls across the stage to music are no style. They are a disaster."

In 2012, Kolyada came under fire when he declared his support Russian president Vladimir Putin's 2012 presidential campaign, saying that Putin was the best of the available candidates. Kolyada was the target of what the BBC described as a "massive bullying campaign" due to his support of Russian president Vladimir Putin. Kolyada's blog was overrun with comments attacking his views, and his theater was papered over with bills for a fake performance.

Kolyada's theater company planned a United States tour in 2017, but the tour was cancelled due to diplomatic tensions between the United States and Russia, and the unavailability of travel visas after the United States withdrew over 1,200 diplomatic personnel from Russia. The company was to bring three of its productions to America: The Twelve Chairs; Violin, Tambourine, and Iron; and Baba Chanel. Interfax reported that the company lost  on the cancellation.

Kolyada is often associated with the Russian New Drama movement, though he rejects that label.

Selected plays

Playing Forfeits, (Играем в фанты)
Our Unsociable Sea, or A Fool's Vessels
Barakb Lashkaldak
Parents' Day
Slingshot (Rogatka, Рогатка)
Chicken
Oginski Polonaise (Polonez Oginskog)
Mannequin
A Tale About the Dead Tsarina
Persian Lilac
Amigo
Tenderness
Carmen Lives

References

External links 
 
 Theater doubles as soup kitchen (BBC)
 http://www.kolyada-theatre.ru/

1957 births
Living people
Russian male dramatists and playwrights
Writers from Yekaterinburg
Actors from Yekaterinburg